Bergsjö is a locality and the seat of Nordanstig Municipality, Gävleborg County, Sweden with 1,266 inhabitants in 2010.

References 

Populated places in Nordanstig Municipality
Hälsingland
Municipal seats of Gävleborg County
Swedish municipal seats